Unborn Child is the sixth studio album by American pop/folk duo Seals and Crofts. It included two low-charting singles, the title track (which reached ) and "The King of Nothing", which reached . The single "Unborn Child" reached No. 63 in Canada.

Album conception
The project originated when Lana Bogan, wife of recording engineer Joseph Bogan, watched a TV documentary on abortion and she was inspired to write a poem from the perspective of the terminated fetus.

According to Dash Crofts, Warner Bros. tried to warn them not to release the album, because the subject of abortion was highly controversial.  Neither Seals nor Crofts cared about the money and stated they were making the record to save lives, while Warner was primarily concerned with making money.  The duo also insisted that the song's message was more universal; that one should not take life too lightly, and should consider its value before carrying out the procedure of abortion.

Album reception
Despite Warners' warnings, the album was released in February 1974 and the label's worst fears came true: the title track was deemed controversial at the time because of its anti-abortion stance and as a result, Unborn Child hurt the duo's popularity and it was criticized by music critics. According to Bill DeYoung, the duo crossed the thin line that separated their music from the Baháʼí Faith, a religion that disapproves of abortion, and abortion-rights advocates boycotted the album and the duo's concerts. For this record, Seals and Crofts won the "Keep Her in Her Place" award from the National Organization for Women (tying with Paul Anka for his recording of "(You're) Having My Baby") during "its annual putdown of male chauvinism" in the media on Women's Equality Day.

Track listing 
All songs written by James Seals and Dash Crofts, except where indicated.

Side One
"Prelude" (:40) (David Paich)
"Windflowers" (3:07) (James Seals, Dan Seals)
"Desert People" (3:31)
"Unborn Child" (3:55) (Seals, Lana Bogan)
"The Story of Her Love" (3:30)
"Dance by the Light of the Moon" (4:47)

Side Two
"Rachel" (:58)
"King of Nothing" (3:16) (Seals)
"29 Years from Texas" (3:14)
"Ledges" (3:08)
"Follow Me" (3:44)
"Big Mac" (4:16)

Charts

Personnel

 Jim Seals – vocals (backing only on "The Story of Her Love" and "King of Nothing"), acoustic guitar, spoken word on "Windflowers"
 Dash Crofts – vocals, mandolin
 Louis Shelton – electric guitar
 Buddy Emmons – steel guitar
 David Paich – keyboards, string arrangements, horn arrangements
 David Hungate – bass
 Jeff Porcaro – drums
 Bobbye Porter – percussion

References

1974 albums
Seals and Crofts albums
Warner Records albums